Martin George Galvin (February 21, 1937 – August 6, 2018) was a prize-winning American poet and teacher. He taught at the Writer's Center in Bethesda, Maryland, St. Joseph's College in Emmitsburg, MD and Walt Whitman High School in Bethesda.

Life
Galvin grew up in Mount Airy, Philadelphia, Pennsylvania. He attended Catholic schools including  St. John's High School, Manayunk, Pennsylvania, from which he graduated in a class of 15. After graduating from Villanova University with a BA degree in Liberal Arts, he continued his education and received his Masters and his Ph.D. degrees in American Literature from the University of Maryland, College Park while teaching literature at St. Joseph's College, Emmitsburg, Maryland. After moving to the Washington, D.C. area in the early 1970s, he taught creative writing and poetry at Walt Whitman High School, Bethesda, Maryland. Before his death, he had most recently taught at the Writer's Center in Bethesda, Maryland.

Family
He and his wife, Theresa, have two daughters, Brenna and Tara. They divided their time between Chevy Chase, Maryland and Ocean View, Delaware.

Work
His poetry, fiction and essays have appeared in The Atlantic Monthly, Best American Poetry 1997, Beltway Poetry Quarterly, D.C. Poets Against the War, Delaware Poetry Review, Four Quarters, Midwest Quarterly, Orion, Poet Lore, Poetry, Poetry East, and Texas Review.

Selected works

Articles

Books 

 'A Way To Home: New and Selected Poems,' (Poets Choice Publishing, 2017)  
 "Sounding the Atlantic," (Broadkill River Press, 2010) 
 
 Appetites (Bogg Publications, 2000). OP.
 Making Beds (Sedwick House, 1989). OP.
 Wild Card (Washington Writers Publishing House, 1989)

Anthologies

"The Poet Upstairs", Washington Writers Publishing House, 1997;
"70 on the 70's", Ashland College, 1981;
"Anthology of Magazine Verse", Los Angeles, 1981, 1983, 1985;
"Songs from Unsung Worlds", Boston, 1985;

Awards
His book of poems Wild Card was the winner of the 1989 Columbia Prize for poetry judged by Howard Nemerov.  He was also the recipient of the 1992 Poet Lore Narrative Poetry Award.

References

External links
http://www.martingalvin.com
Burghers of Calais by Martin Galvin
Audio interview on Library of Congress website
"Innisfree 15, fall 2012. A Closer Look: Martin Galvin, plus a selection of 20 poems

1937 births
American male poets
University of Maryland, College Park alumni
Villanova University alumni
Saint Joseph College and Mother Seton Shrine faculty
Writers from Philadelphia
2018 deaths